Don't Blame Me is an Australian children's television program. In the United Kingdom, the show is known as Don't Blame the Koalas. The series was originally aired on the Nine Network and is also currently shown on ABC3 (the latter channel airing under the UK title).

Series overview
The show is set in Wallaby Park, an Australian wildlife park in the Ku-ring-gai National Park where the King family arrive from the United Kingdom to live with their Australian relatives after going bankrupt. Before they arrive they believe they have inherited a large cattle ranch, but on arrival are disappointed to meet a largely unprofitable, slightly run down wildlife park.

Most of the comedy in the series is slightly surreal in a Round the Twist/Driven Crazy style way. Special effects and sounds are used to convey the characters actions mixed in with slightly speeded up footage when walking. Many of the characters frequently break the fourth wall. Having to do whatever means to keep the wildlife park up to building code standards for visitor's, Vinnie – played by Anh Do – has a dark past that he must call upon his old friends still involved in the Golden Triangle to save the day.

Cast
Liam Hess – Gregory King
Hollie Chapman – Gemma King
Basia A'Hern – Kate King
Shaun Loseby- Mark King
Henry Nixon – Chris King
Fiona Terry – Gabrielle King
Anh Do – Vinnie

Season 1

Production

Filming
Much of the filming for Don't Blame the Koalas was done on location in various parts of the Thirty Mile Zone around Los Angeles.

Unike Malcolm in the Middle, studio filming for Don't Blame the Koalas took place on Stage 21 at Nine Network Australia, 1 Denison Street, North Sydney.

Like Malcolm in the Middle, hallmarks of the series' filming and structure, many of which heavily influenced later programs, included the following:
 A 1 and a half second whip pan as a transition from one scene to another.
 Frequent pieces to camera delivered by the King family.

External links 
 

Australian children's television series
Children's comedy television series
Nine Network original programming
2002 Australian television series debuts
2003 Australian television series endings
Television series by Endemol Australia